An American woman named Sherri Papini disappeared on November 2, 2016, reportedly while out jogging a mile from her home in Redding, California. Papini was 34 years old at the time. She reappeared three weeks later on Thanksgiving Day, November 24, having been reportedly freed by her captors at 4:30 that morning still wearing restraints, on the side of County Road 17 near Interstate 5 in Yolo County, about 150 miles (240 km) south of where she disappeared.

The case garnered major media attention, with national law enforcement experts reporting doubts or otherwise baffled as to the unlikely details and inconsistencies of the reported abduction.

On March 3, 2022, Papini was arrested on charges of making false statements to federal law enforcement officers and for mail fraud. According to the Department of Justice, Papini fabricated the story of her abduction. She had reportedly been staying with a former boyfriend, James Reyes, during the time she was supposedly missing and had harmed herself in order to give credence to her lies. In August 2020 she stood by her story when questioned by a federal agent and a detective from the Shasta County Sheriff’s Office, despite being advised that it was a crime to lie to a federal agent. Papini was charged with mail fraud as she had received over $30,000 from the California Victim's Compensation Board between 2017 and 2021.

On March 9, 2022, Papini was released from jail before her trial on a $120,000 bond and after surrendering her passport. She and her lawyer had no comment on the allegations against her. Papini had faced up to 25 years in prison between the charges of mail fraud and lying to a federal officer.  However, six weeks after her arrest, Papini signed a plea deal admitting that she had orchestrated the hoax. In September 2022, she was sentenced to 18 months in prison and fined $300,000.

Background 

Sherri Louise Graeff was born on June 11, 1982. She married Keith Papini in October 2009. The couple have two children together, one son and one daughter.  On March 3, 2022, the day on which Sherri was arrested on federal charges, the couple separated.  In April 2022, a few days after Sherri pleaded guilty to fraud charges, Keith filed for divorce from his wife and for sole custody of their children.

Timeline 

Sherri's husband Keith Papini first became concerned when he returned from his job at Best Buy on November 2, 2016, and could not find his wife at home. He eventually used the "Find My iPhone" application to locate her cell phone and ear buds at the intersection of Sunrise Drive and Old Oregon Trail, about a mile from their home.

According to Shasta County Sheriff Tom Bosenko, in interviews Papini said she was held by two Hispanic women who took steps to keep their faces hidden from her, either by wearing masks or by keeping Papini's head covered. Papini was branded on her right shoulder during her captivity but details of what the brand included have not been revealed. When investigators questioned Sherri at a later date, she claimed that it looked like a verse from the Book of Exodus, but she did not provide any solid evidence behind this vague claim. According to a statement by her husband Keith Papini, Sherri was physically abused during her captivity, had her nose broken and her hair cut off, and weighed 87 pounds (40 kg) when she was released.

At that time, the sheriff said it was still an active investigation and authorities were "looking for a dark-colored SUV with two Hispanic females armed with a handgun." The sheriff indicated there was sensitive information not being released at that time. Detectives had authored close to 20 search warrants and they said they are examining cellphone records, bank accounts, email and social media profiles. Investigators declined to discuss what prompted them to file the search warrants or why detectives had traveled out of state.

According to Bosenko, Keith Papini "has been cooperative and even volunteered for a polygraph, which he passed." However, Bosenko has not ruled him out as a suspect in the abduction, stating "We are keeping an open mind and looking at all avenues." Keith was reported as possibly compromising the investigation with his statements to the media after Sherri was found.

Authorities declined to comment on specific details of the ongoing investigation, but reported that they were actively pursuing the case. In November, while Papini was still missing, authorities executed more than 12 search warrants in Michigan. The FBI provided assistance in the case.

Papini was found with both male and female DNA on her, neither of which matched her or her husband. The FBI ran the samples through the Combined DNA Index System (CODIS) and found no matches. In March 2022, it was reported that DNA found on her clothing matched that of an ex-boyfriend, James Reyes, who confirmed that Papini stayed with him during the time she was allegedly kidnapped.

Legal proceedings 

On March 3, 2022, Sherri Papini was arrested by the FBI, accused of lying to federal agents and faking her kidnapping to spend time with her ex-boyfriend, away from her husband and family. Six weeks after her arrest, Papini signed a plea deal admitting that she had orchestrated the hoax.

In September 2022, she was sentenced to 18 months in prison and fined $300,000.

Media coverage and in popular culture 

At the time of her purported kidnapping, Papini's disappearance was featured extensively in national news, including Good Morning America, 20/20, True Crime Daily, MSNBC, NBC Evening News, Inside Edition, ABC Evening News, The Today Show, The Daily Mail, Primetime Justice on HLN, Us Weekly, Fox News, and the cover of People Magazine.

Since the story was confirmed a hoax, it was again featured in national media coverage on ABC Evening News, CBS Mornings, Good Morning America, NBC News, CNBC, Dr. Phil, Inside Edition, USA Today, Court TV, People Magazine, and The Today Show.  The Papini case was also profiled in an episode of Dateline NBC, entitled "The Curious Case of Sherri Papini", Reelz Investigates: Sherri Papini, HLN Investigates "Runaway Mom: The Sherri Papini Story", Oxygen's "Sherri Papini: Lies, Lies, and More Lies" and was the subject of many true-crime podcasts. 

The first scripted film based on the hoax is the 2023 Lifetime's television film, Hoax: The Kidnapping of Sherri Papini, with Jaime King playing Sherri Papini.

See also 
 Runaway bride case, a 2005 abduction hoax in Georgia, United States

References

External links 

 Sheriff Bosenko statement on November 24 about Sherri Papini being found alive
 Sheriff Bosenko statement on November 25
 Criminal Complaint and Affidavit (2022)

2016 hoaxes
2016 in California
Hoaxes in the United States
November 2016 crimes in the United States
Redding, California
Yolo County, California